Coptosperma is a genus of flowering plants in the family Rubiaceae. It contains 19 species native to Africa, the Arabian Peninsula, and various islands of the Indian Ocean (Madagascar, Comoros, Mauritius, Réunion, etc.).

Species

 Coptosperma bernierianum (Baill.) De Block
 Coptosperma borbonicum (Hend.& Andr.Hend.) De Block
 Coptosperma cymosum (Willd. ex Schult.) De Block
 Coptosperma graveolens (S.Moore) Degreef
 Coptosperma graveolens subsp. arabicum (Cufod.) Degreef
 Coptosperma graveolens subsp. graveolens
 Coptosperma graveolens var. impolitum (Bridson) Degreef
 Coptosperma humblotii (Drake) De Block
 Coptosperma kibuwae (Bridson) Degreef
 Coptosperma littorale (Hiern) Degreef
 Coptosperma madagascariensis (Baill.) De Block
 Coptosperma mitochondrioides Mouly & De Block
 Coptosperma neurophyllum (S.Moore) Degreef
 Coptosperma nigrescens Hook.f.
 Coptosperma pachyphyllum (Baker) De Block
 Coptosperma peteri (Bridson) Degreef
 Coptosperma rhodesiacum (Bremek.) Degreef
 Coptosperma sessiliflorum De Block
 Coptosperma somaliense Degreef
 Coptosperma supra-axillare (Hemsl.) Degreef
 Coptosperma wajirense (Bridson) Degreef
 Coptosperma zygoon (Bridson) Degreef

References

External links
Coptosperma in the World Checklist of Rubiaceae

Rubiaceae genera
Pavetteae
Flora of Africa
Taxa named by Joseph Dalton Hooker